Nebi may refer to:

People
 Nebi or Hnabi (710–789), Alemannian duke
 Nebi Mustafi (born 1976), Albanian-Macedonian football player
 Nebi Sefa (1861–1942), Albanian politician

See also
 
 Nabi (disambiguation)